The Clackamas Town Center Transit Center is a bus transit center and MAX Light Rail station on the MAX Green Line, located in Clackamas County, Oregon, in the southeastern part of the Portland metropolitan area. It is the southern terminus for the I-205 MAX branch.

Owned by regional transit agency TriMet, the current transit center opened in 2009 and is located on the east side of the Clackamas Town Center mall, adjacent to Interstate 205. An earlier transit center at the mall had opened in 1981.

History

Original location

The first Clackamas Town Center Transit Center opened in 1981 and was located on the north side of the shopping mall, next to the movie theater and Meier & Frank store. Buses began serving the site of the transit center (TC) on June 14, 1981, but construction of the TC's passenger facilities was still under way at that time. An island with a large passenger shelter in the middle was constructed, with buses looping clockwise around it and serving stops designated for each route.  This was completed in the fall and came into use on November 22, 1981. 

The transit center was funded by a combination of a $350,000 grant from the federal Urban Mass Transportation Administration  and $50,000 from the mall's owner, the Hahn Company, but $90,000 of the UMTA grant was for transit improvements elsewhere at the then-new shopping mall, including a park-and-ride lot to the east of the mall (near where the MAX station was built many years later) and a signalized bus-only exit road onto Sunnyside Road.  Only three bus routes served the transit center originally, routes 72-82nd Avenue, 76-King Road and 78-Linwood, but other routes were added later, including 79-Canby in 1982. In 1985, routes 31-Estacada and 71-Killingsworth-60th were diverted or extended to the Clackamas TC, route 78 was renumbered 28, and route 76 was replaced by 29 Lake-Webster and a change in route 31.  Other changes to the bus service have been made in subsequent years, and a list of routes currently using the TC is given later in this article.

Closure and temporary location
Expansion of the mall brought about the closure of the original transit center in June 2006, with the TC temporarily moved just to the east of the 1981 site, and then in December 2007 settling on a new "permanent" configuration in which all bus routes served a single westbound stop or, in the case of route 31 only, eastbound stop, still located next to the movie theater but on the main roadway, not using a bus-only road or loop. By this time TriMet had given final approval to the extension of the MAX Green Line to Clackamas Town Center and planned to construct a new transit center at the site of the MAX station, which would be next to the I-205 freeway on the east side of the mall.

Current site and MAX station

The new Clackamas Town Center TC and Green Line MAX station opened on September 12, 2009.  It has a three-story, 750-space park-and-ride garage, and is served by 10 bus lines. The light-rail station is set up as an island platform station. Additionally, it has a single-track stub extending south of the station, for the storage of an overflow or out-of-service (defective) train. The I-205 Bike Path passes by the transit center.

Bus lines
Along with the MAX Green Line, the transit center is served by the following bus lines:
29 - Lake/Webster Rd.
30 - Estacada
31 - Webster Rd. 
33 - McLoughlin/King Rd.
34 - Linwood/River Rd.
71 - 60th Ave.
72 - Killingsworth/82nd Ave.
79 - Clackamas/Oregon City
152 - Milwaukie
155 - Sunnyside
156 - Mather Road

See also
 List of TriMet transit centers

References

External links

Clackamas Town Center Transit Center – TriMet page

MAX Light Rail stations
MAX Green Line
Railway stations in the United States opened in 2009
Transportation buildings and structures in Clackamas County, Oregon
TriMet transit centers
1981 establishments in Oregon
Railway stations in Clackamas County, Oregon